The following list of Carnegie libraries in Minnesota provides detailed information on Carnegie libraries in Minnesota, United States, where 65 public libraries were built from 57 grants (totaling $969,375) awarded by the Carnegie Corporation of New York from 1901 to 1918. In addition, Hamline University in Saint Paul was awarded a $30,000 grant on March 12, 1906, to construct an academic library.  In Minnesota grants were given between 1899 and 1918.

Of Minnesota's 66 original Carnegie libraries, 48 are still standing.  25 continue to house public libraries while others have been adapted into art centers or office space.  Of the 18 lost libraries, one burned down and the rest were demolished, often because they were unworkably deficient in handicap accessibility.  38 of the surviving libraries are listed on the National Register of Historic Places (NRHP).

Key

Public libraries

Academic libraries

Notes

References

Note: The above references, while all authoritative, are not entirely mutually consistent. Some details of this list may have been drawn from one of the references without support from the others.  Reader discretion is advised.

External links
Carnegie Libraries Tour – Placeography, Minnesota Historical Society

 
Minnesota
Libraries
Libraries